Elin Ekblom Bak (born 5 June 1981) is a Swedish football midfielder, currently playing for Elitettan club Älta IF. She previously played for teams including Tyresö FF in Sweden's Damallsvenskan.

She also works as a scientist, publishing research in the British Journal of Sports Medicine which posited that sedentary behaviour such as sitting at a desk is harmful even for people who exercise regularly.

Ekblom Bak made her senior Sweden debut on 1 February 2004, in a 3–1 win over Canada.

She signed a professional contract with Espanyol in Spain, but rules prevented her from playing League matches, only in Cup and non competitive games. Ekblom Bak engaged sports lawyer Jean-Louis Dupont to make a legal challenge on her behalf and the rules eventually changed, but disgruntled Ekblom Bak had already decided to leave.

Footnotes

References

1981 births
Living people
Swedish women's footballers
Damallsvenskan players
Sweden women's international footballers
Hammarby Fotboll (women) players
Djurgårdens IF Fotboll (women) players
Tyresö FF players
Swedish expatriate sportspeople in Spain
Expatriate women's footballers in Spain
RCD Espanyol Femenino players
Women's association football defenders